Am Schöpfwerk Church is a Roman Catholic parish church, dedicated to Saint Francis of Assisi, and is the most recently built church in Meidling, the 12th district of Vienna, Austria.

Description 

The church is situated on the edge of the large-scale Viennese city housing development Am Schöpfwerk, which was constructed 1976–80 on the south slope of the Wienerberg in Altmannsdorf, part of the district of Meidling (Lichtensterngasse 4). The architect of the housing development, Viktor Hufnagl, also designed the church, which was built 1979–81. The Am Schöpfwerk parish was established in 1982.

Because of the nature of the terrain the church is built on two levels: the lower storey accommodates the parish rooms and offices, while the church itself is located in the upper one. The building is composed of cubic elements piled up symmetrically in the form of a stepped pyramid. The load-bearing elements are plastered, and consist of a reinforced concrete skeleton filled in with exposed brickwork. A seven-storey bell tower stands next to the low entrance hall. 

A stairway leads from the rooms on the ground floor to a central vestibule through which the church proper is accessible. This consists of a central space, with room for 220 people seated and 400 standing, in the shape of a Greek cross surrounded by an ambulatory delineated by concrete pillars. The cubic elements, which draw together in this space, terminate at the apex of the pyramid in a lantern of glass windows. The white interior, highlighted by green and golden ceramic tiles, is strongly reminiscent of the Jugendstil.

The main fitting is the central altar, of ceramic, raised up on two steps. Behind it is a 19th-century crucifix. There is also a Pietà painted by Carry Hauser. Michael Fuchs, son of the painter Ernst Fuchs, painted the picture of Saint Francis of Assisi. The ceramic Way of the Cross and holy water stoup are by Franz Josef Altenburg, the remaining decorations by Traude Windbrechtinger.

In the northwest corner is the square Chapel of St. Clare.

Sources 
 Felix Czeike: Historisches Lexikon Wien Bd. 1. Kremayr & Scheriau, Vienna 1992
 Dehio-Handbuch Wien. X. bis XIX. und XXI. bis XXIII. Bezirk. Verlag Anton Schroll, Vienna 1996

External links 

 Website of Am Schöpfwerk Parish 

Roman Catholic churches in Vienna
Buildings and structures in Meidling
Roman Catholic churches completed in 1982
1982 establishments in Austria
20th-century Roman Catholic church buildings in Austria